Ashk-e Majan Pahlu (also Romanized as Ashk-e Mahān Pahlū; also known as Ashk-e Jahān Pahlū) is a village in Tutaki Rural District, in the Central District of Siahkal County, Gilan Province, Iran. At the 2006 census, its population was 310, in 81 families.

References 

Populated places in Siahkal County